Fountain Hill is a borough in Lehigh County, Pennsylvania, United States. The population of Fountain Hill was 4,832 at the 2020 census, an increase over the figure of 4,597 tabulated in 2010. It is part of the Lehigh Valley metropolitan area, which had a population of 861,899 and was the 68th most populous metropolitan area in the U.S. as of the 2020 census.

Geography
Fountain Hill is located at  (40.601698, -75.396357). It uses the Bethlehem ZIP code of 18015.

Transportation

No numbered highways pass through Fountain Hill. The main thoroughfare through the borough is Broadway, which follows a northeast-southwest alignment through the middle of town. Pennsylvania Route 378 and Pennsylvania Route 412 are the closest numbered highways, both of which pass just to the east of Fountain Hill.

Education
Fountain Hill is served by the Bethlehem Area School District. Fountain Hill Elementary School for kindergarten through grade five is located in Fountain Hill.

Demographics
As of the census of 2010, there were 4,597 people living in the borough.  The racial makeup of the borough was 81.4% White, 6.6% African American, 0.1% Native American, 0.8% Asian, 0.0% Pacific Islander, 7.7% from other races, and 3.4% from two or more races. Hispanic or Latino of any race were 22.5% of the population.

Notable people

Stephen Vincent Benét, former author
Joseph F. Brennan, former Pennsylvania State Representative
Edwin Drake, discovered crude oil in Titusville, Pennsylvania
T. J. Rooney, former Pennsylvania State Representative

References

External links

 Official website

1893 establishments in Pennsylvania
Boroughs in Lehigh County, Pennsylvania
Boroughs in Pennsylvania
Populated places established in 1893